Export Development Bank of Iran (EDBI) (Bank Tusi'h-e Sadârat Iran) is Iran's export-import bank. The bank was incorporated as a policy bank, owned by the Iranian government, and provides financial and other conventional banking services to Iranian exporters and importers.

Backgrounds
Pursuant to the approval made by the Extraordinary General Meeting of the Banks on July 10, 1991, the Export Development Bank of Iran was founded on November 24, 1991, as a state-owned bank. Under its charter, EDBI acts as the administrative arm of the Government of Iran to contribute to the national economy, through promoting non-oil export of goods and other technical and engineering services of Iranian origin and also to enhance economic cooperation with other countries.

International credit ratings
Capital Intelligence (CI), Credit Analysis & Ratings on August 11, 2020 announced that it has affirmed the Long-Term Foreign Currency Rating (LT FCR) and Short-Term Foreign Currency Rating (ST FCR) of Export Development Bank of Iran (EDBI) at 'B' and 'B', respectively. At the same time, CI Ratings has affirmed EDBI's Bank Standalone Rating (BSR) of 'b', Core Financial Strength (CFS) rating of 'b' and Extraordinary Support Level (ESL) of Moderate. The Outlook for the LT FCR and BSR remains Negative.

Access to the Sovereign Wealth Fund
The Export Development Bank of Iran has access to the Government Fund (Sovereign Wealth Fund) administered by the National Development Fund of Iran [NDFI] which was founded in 2011. The NDFI has so far signed agency contracts with different Iranian banks including Exports Development Bank of Iran (EDBI) to allocate US$9 billion for supporting investments in the private Sector.

International Sanctions
After January 16, 2016, which marks Implementation Day of the JCPOA, also known as Iran's Nuclear Deal, Export Development Bank of Iran (EDBI) is not currently on the United Nations (UN) or the European Union (EU) Sanction Lists. Nonetheless, according to US Dept. of Treasury, Office of Foreign Assets Control (OFAC) on May 11, 2018, EDBI is on the SDN list, subject to Secondary Sanctions.

References

External links

 

Banks of Iran
Banks established in 1991
Companies listed on the Tehran Stock Exchange
Export credit agencies
Foreign trade of Iran
Iranian companies established in 1991